Yamunotri District is a newly proposed district to split from Uttarkashi district, Uttarakhand, India. The area of this proposed district is 2839 km2 and population of this district is 138,559.

Tehsils 
 Purola
 Mori
 Barkot

Blocks 
 Three

Religious places 

 Yamunotri Temple

References 

Proposed districts of Uttarakhand